Stephen Chang may refer to:
 Stephen S. Chang (1918–1996), Chinese-born American food scientist